Ellis Marsalis may refer to:

Ellis Marsalis Sr. (1908–2004), American businessman
Ellis Marsalis Jr. (1934–2020), American jazz pianist